De Kat is the only remaining working windmill in the world which makes paint. The mill is in the Zaanse Schans, Zaanstad.

The original mill 'De Kat' was built in 1646 as an oil mill. In 1782 it was destroyed by fire but was rapidly rebuilt again. The mill was in use until 1904 and then was partially demolished.

In 1960 the eight-sided paint mill 'De Duinjager' was removed from its former position owing to urban development and placed on top of the old storehouse of 'De Kat'. The mill is again grinding raw materials such as chalk to make pigments for paints in the traditional way. The mill is owned by the Vereniging De Zaansche Molen.

Gallery

See also 

 De Huisman, Zaandam
 De Os, Zaandam
 De Zoeker, Zaandam
 De Gekroonde Poelenburg, Zaandam
 Het Jonge Schaap, Zaandam
 Smock mill

External links 

 
 Vereniging de Zaansche Molen
 Een uitgebreid fotoverslag
 Film about the mill 

Windmills in North Holland
Rijksmonuments in North Holland
Smock mills in the Netherlands
Grinding mills in the Netherlands
Windmills completed in 1782
Zaandam
1782 establishments in the Dutch Republic
18th-century architecture in the Netherlands